Janka-Puszta or Jankovac was a training camp set up for the Ustashe terrorist organisation in 1931. The camp was located in the Zala County of Hungary, close to the border of the then Kingdom of Yugoslavia near the villages of Murakeresztúr and Belezna. The camp was one of a string of training camps established in Hungary and Italy by the Ustashe. It housed several hundred émigré recruits, mostly manual laborers returning from Western Europe and North America. The recruits swore an oath of loyalty to the leader of the Ustashe, Ante Pavelić, took part in militant exercises, and produced anti-Serb propaganda material.

Background

In the summer of 1931, the location was leased by the Hungary authorities to  who served as the camp commander. Ustashe members were already active in the region on both sides of the border at the time. Situated on a hill on approximately 150 acres, the camp consisted of two buildings, open fields and a forest. In November 1931, the first members of the Ustashe terrorist organisation arrived. The camp started out as a sort of commune, a refuge for fugitive members of the Ustashe group who had recently escaped from Yugoslavia. After months of preparation, Gustav Perčec  began to actively seek members to join the camp. In co-operation with the Hungarian authorities, Ustashe fugitives crossing the Yugoslav-Hungarian border were interviewed by Hungarian police and their details were passed onto Percec. After it was confirmed a fugitive was not a Yugoslav spy, the Hungarian police would take them to the camp and would be provided a false name and acceptance into the camp. Andrija Betlehem lived near Hungarian border and established a channel for transport of Ustaše from Croatia to their training camp in Janka-Puszta.
 
Those living at the training camp partook in regimented programs. Alongside Croatian nationalism indoctrination, Ustashe members took part in military training and also, conducted duties to keep the camp running. The head instructors of weapons training were Hungarian officers and the living conditions at the camp were said to have been poor, with camp members receiving severe punishment for any misbehavior. Much of the weaponry came from Italy, and many high ranking and prominent members of the Ustashe organisation visited the camp including: Ante Pavelic. In relation with the agreement reached in 1929 between the pro-Bulgarian Internal Macedonian Revolutionary Organization and the Ustashe on a common struggle against Yugoslavia. As result, Bulgarian Vlado Chernozemski was designated as their instructor in terrorist attacks and was sent to Italy in 1931. Since mid-1932, taking steps to improve its relations with Yugoslavia, the Italian authorities have closed the Borgo Val di Taro Ustashe camp. Thus Vlado Chernozemski, was transferred  to Janka-Puszta. From the period of 1932-1934, the camp served as the ideological and technical support base for many militant actions including the Velebit uprising and the assassination of Alexander I of Yugoslavia.

In the camp lived also the lover of Perčec-Jelka Pogorelec, who was an agent of Serbian intelligence. One night she secretly crossed the border. In October 1933 she published a series of materials for the camp in the "Novosti" newspaper in Zagreb. This greatly complicated Yugoslavia's relations with Hungary. Cross-border conflicts arose between the two countries, accompanied by mutual attacks. Thus, in April 1934, Belgrade made a formal complaint to the League of Nations. There was also a complaint filled by the Hungarian regent Horthy. The League formed a commission to review the case in May. Under these circumstances, the Hungarian authorities were forced to close the camp and urgently move the Ustashe in the nearby town of Nagykanizsa. When the members of the  international commission arrived at the camp, they recognized that the complaint about a terrorist camp was not correct. In this way the camp fell into disuse in late 1934.

References

Sources
 

Ustaše
Terrorism in Hungary